Words in Colour is an approach to literacy invented by Dr Caleb Gattegno.  Words in Colour first appeared in 1962, published simultaneously in the UK and US.  Later versions were published in French and Spanish.

Words in Colour is a synthetic phonics system that uses colour to indicate the phonetic properties of letters.    The system has been adapted for the use of deaf children, and for dyslexic children.  Words in Colour was one of a number of colour assisted schemes, being followed by Colour Story Reading, Colour Phonics System and English Colour Code.

See also
Silent Way
 Initial teaching alphabet
 Phonics
 Look-say
 Whole-word method
 Whole language

Bibliography
 Teacher's Guide to Words in Colour Gattegno.

References

Literacy